Syrphophilus is a genus of parasitoid wasps belonging to the family Ichneumonidae.

The species of this genus are found in Europe, Easternmost Asia and Northern America.

Species:
 Syrphophilus asperatus Dasch, 1964
 SSyrphophilus bizonarius (Gravenhorst, 1829)

References

Ichneumonidae
Ichneumonidae genera